Katarina Srebotnik was the defending champion, but could not compete this year after entering the US Open Series.

Zheng Jie won the title by defeating Anastasia Myskina 6–4, 6–1 in the final.

Seeds

Draw

Finals

Top half

Bottom half

References

External links
 Official results archive (ITF)
 Official results archive (WTA)

Singles
Nordea Nordic Light Open
Nordic